"787" is a song by Puerto Rican reggaetón recording artist Ivy Queen. It features additional vocals provided by Zion & Lennox and Jowell. The song was written by Queen along with Xavier Sanchez and the producers Jorgie Milliano and Chaz Mishan and released as a single on June 6, 2019.

The song peaked at number forty-one on the Billboard Latin Airplay chart and number twenty-three on the Billboard Latin Rhythm Airplay chart.

Composition
The song interpolates several songs from the reggaeton genre including, "Soy Una Gargola" performed by Arcangel and Randy, "Mi Cama Huele a Ti" performed by Tito "El Bambino" and Zion & Lennox, "Zun Da Da" performed by Zion, "Eso Ehh..!!!" performed by Alexis & Fido, "Pide un Deseo" performed by Baby Rasta & Gringo, "Gasolina" performed by Daddy Yankee, "El Telefono" performed by Hector "El Father" and Wisin & Yandel, "Dame un Kiss" performed by Franco "El Gorila" and "La Batidora" performed by Yaga & Mackie and Don Omar.

It also interpolates "Dile" performed by Don Omar and "Pegate a la Pared" performed by Yandel. The song also includes interpolations of "Pa Que Retozen" performed by Tego Calderon, "Calla" performed by Vico C, "Amor Mio" performed by Eddie Dee, "Bendicion Mami" performed by Mexicano 777 and "Punto 40" performed by Baby Rasta & Gringo.

According to Jennifer Mota for the Spanish-language magazine People en Español, Queen pays homage by referencing songs and lyrics performed by her male peers within the genre of reggaeton. According to Mota, the song is from a woman's perspective. Billboard magazine's Jessica Roiz called "787" an "infectious song" that "pays homage to old-school reggaeton." Roiz noted the sampling of early 2000s reggaeton songs in 2019 becoming a trend.

Release and promotion
A behind-the-scenes video detailing the making of the song was filmed in Barcelona, Spain. It was posted on YouTube on June 14, 2019, and has obtained over 280,000 views as of April 2022.

Commercial performance
For the week of July 13, 2019, "787" debuted at number twenty-four on the Billboard Latin Rhythm Airplay chart. The following week of July 20, 2019, the song rose one position to number twenty-three. It spent two more weeks, the weeks of July 27, 2019 and August 3, 2019, at this position. One week after debuting on the Latin Rhythm Airplay chart, the week of July 20, 2019, the song debuted at number forty-nine on the Billboard Latin Airplay chart. It spent a second week at number forty-nine, the week of July 27, 2019. In its third week, the week of August 3, 2019, the song rose eight positions to number forty-one.

Chart performance

References

2019 singles
Ivy Queen songs
Spanish-language songs
Songs written by Ivy Queen
Songs with feminist themes
Songs about Puerto Rico